Hemidactylus chikhaldaraensis, the Chikhaldara brookiish gecko  is a species of gecko. It is endemic to India.

References

Hemidactylus
Reptiles described in 2019
Endemic fauna of India
Reptiles of India